The Yaoundé General Hospital (Hôpital Général de Yaoundé - HGY) is a hospital in Yaoundé, Cameroon, established in 1985. It serves as a teaching center, and is a reference hospital for other hospitals in the Yaounde region.

The hospital was designed by the C. Cacoub and Buban Ngu Design Group and built by SBBM & Six Construct. It covers an area of 20,301 square metres and as of 2001 had 302 beds.
The hospital provides medicine, surgery, obstetrics, gynaecology and pediatrics.
It is the only hospital in the Central Region with a dialysis center.
However, as of July 2011 patients were being turned away due to shortage of dialysis units.

Notes

Hospital buildings completed in 1985
Hospitals in Cameroon
Hospitals established in 1985
1985 establishments in Cameroon
Buildings and structures in Yaoundé